Fumihiko Sori (曽利 文彦) is a Japanese film director and film producer.  He received a nomination for the 'Best Director' prize at the Japanese Academy Awards for his directing debut, Ping Pong.

Filmography

Director
2002 Ping Pong
2007 Vexille
2008 Ichi
2009 To
2011 Tomorrow's Joe
2012 Dragon Age: Dawn of the Seeker
2017 Fullmetal Alchemist
2022 Fullmetal Alchemist: Revenge of Scar 
2022 Fullmetal Alchemist: The Final Alchemy

Producer
2004 Appleseed

Visual effects supervisor
1998 Andromedia
1999 Himitsu
2000 Keizoku

Awards
Awards of the Japanese Academy 2002 Best Director
Mainichi Film Concours 2002 Technical Achievement
Yokohama Film Festival 2002 Best New Director

References

External links
 
 

1964 births
Japanese film directors
Living people